Sadievo may refer to:

 In Bulgaria (written in Cyrillic as Съдиево):
 Sadievo, Burgas Province - a village in the Aytos municipality, Burgas Province
 Sadievo, Sliven Province - a village in the Nova Zagora municipality, Sliven Province